The Leica M (Typ 262) is a digital rangefinder camera announced by Leica Camera on November 19, 2015. The shutter and cocking mechanism are much quieter than in the earlier and higher-priced M Typ 240, and allow two frames per second to be recorded in single shot mode. The model omits the Typ 240's live view and video capabilities, and has a much simpler menu structure and one-button access to white balance settings. The Leica M (Typ 262) has a CMOS full-frame sensor with a 24 Megapixel resolution, with an ISO of up to 6400. The usual brass camera body has been replaced with an aluminum alloy top plate, for a reduction in weight.

In 2017 Leica released a Leica M (Typ 262) with a ‘red anodized finish’ with a special edition Leica Summicron-M 50 mm f/2 ASPH in the same finish. Only 100 bodies were made.

The Leica M (Typ 262) superseded the Leica M-E (Typ 220), and was superseded by Leica M-E (Typ 240) in 2019.

References

External links
 

Leica M-mount cameras
Digital rangefinder cameras
Cameras introduced in 2015